Seh Kileh (also Romanized as Seh Kīleh, Seh Keyleh, Seh Kheileh, and Seh Kīlah) is a village in Peyrajeh Rural District, in the Central District of Neka County, Mazandaran Province, Iran. At the 2006 census, its population was 349, in 85 families.

References 

Populated places in Neka County